Irma Elizondo Ramírez (November 21, 1945 – August 4, 2014) was a Mexican politician affiliated with the PRI. She served as Deputy of the LXII Legislature of the Mexican Congress, representing the  First Federal Electoral District of Coahuila. She died of heart attack on August 4, 2014 at the age of 68.

References

External links
Irma Elizondo Ramírez
Presentará Irma Elizondo informe al CEN

1945 births
2014 deaths
Politicians from Coahuila
Women members of the Chamber of Deputies (Mexico)
Members of the Chamber of Deputies (Mexico) for Coahuila
Institutional Revolutionary Party politicians
21st-century Mexican politicians
21st-century Mexican women politicians
Deputies of the LXII Legislature of Mexico